Hervé Hasquin (born 31 December 1942, Charleroi) is a Belgian university professor (ULB), historian and politician.

Honours 
 1984 : Commander in the Order of Leopold II.
 1989: Knight in the Legion of Honour.
 1987: Commander in the Order of the Lion of Senegal.
 1999 : Grand Officer in the Order of Leopold.
 2004 : Knight Grand Cross in the Order of the Crown.

References

academieroyale.be

1942 births
20th-century Belgian historians
Politicians from Charleroi
Living people
Writers from Charleroi
Members of the Royal Academy of Belgium
Historians of Belgium
Ministers-President of the French Community of Belgium
Reformist Movement politicians
Academic staff of the Université libre de Bruxelles
Order of Leopold (Belgium)
Commanders of the Order of Leopold II
Chevaliers of the Légion d'honneur
Grand Crosses of the Order of the Crown (Belgium)